Joshua Tijani (born 21 April 1992) is a Ghanaian professional footballer who currently plays as a left back for Aduana Stars.

Club career
Tijani began his youth and senior career with Ghana Premier League club Wa All Stars debuting in the 2012–2013 Ghanaian Premier League season prior to joining Ashanti Gold on 1 July 2013 for the beginning of the 2013–2014 Ghanaian Premier League season.

International career
In November 2013, coach Maxwell Konadu invited Tijani to be included in the Ghana national football team for the 2013 WAFU Nations Cup. Tijani helped the Ghana national football team to a first-place finish after Ghana beat Senegal national football team by three goals to one. Tijani was part of the Ghana national football team for the 2014 African Nations Championship that finished runner-up.

Honours

National Team 

 WAFU Nations Cup Winner: 2013
 African Nations Championship Runner-up: 2014

References

External links

1992 births
Living people
Ghanaian footballers
Legon Cities FC players
Sekondi Hasaacas F.C. players
Ashanti Gold SC players
Aduana Stars F.C. players
Association football fullbacks
Association football central defenders
Ghana Premier League players
WAFU Nations Cup players
2014 African Nations Championship players
Ghana international footballers
Ghana A' international footballers